Flörsheim am Main is a town in the Main-Taunus district, in Hesse, Germany. It is situated on the right bank of the River Main, opposite Rüsselsheim, 12 km east of Mainz and 21 km west of Frankfurt.

Geography

Population
 Flörsheim (11,950 Residents)
 Weilbach (3,831 Residents) (independent district)
 Wicker (3,472 Residents) (independent district)
 Bad Weilbach
 Keramag/Falkenberg (706 Residents)
As of 31 July 2005

Town partnerships

Flörsheim has partnerships with:
 Pyskowice, Poland since 2005
 Pérols, France since 1992
 Güzelbahçe, Turkey since 2011

People from Flörsheim
Abdelaziz Ahanfouf (born 14 January 1978), former German-Moroccan football player, eight international matches for Morocco.
Georg Badeck,  former Member of Landtag, CDU, died 2004
Dr Hugo Noerdlinger, Jewish chemical factory owner and inventor, died 1917. Nazis seized the factory from his two sons who died in Nazi concentration camps and are commemorated on the Holocaust Memorial wall in Wiesbaden. A mall has been built over the factory site.
Dr. Max Schohl (died 1943, in Auschwitz), Jewish chemical factory owner and patron.
Deniz Yücel (born 10 September 1973), journalist and publisher, best known for his works in Die Tageszeitung and Die Welt

Honorary citizen
 1949: Georg von Opel (1912–1971), car operator and sportsman
 1955: Jakob Altmaier (1889–1963), German politician (SPD), MdB, journalist, local columnist under the pseudonym "Gänsekippelschorsch"

History

Events
In the fall the Flörsheimer Kerb is celebrated along the Main River. It was created in relation to the Kirchweihfest in the St. Gallus Church in Flörsheim. It is a small fair with a few rides and booths to eat.

Furthermore, there is a weekend-long open-air concert once a year called Flörsheim Open Air. It is a little festival underneath the Main river's bridge that leads to Rüsselsheim. In 2007 it will be the 32nd festival.

There is also Flörsheims Carnival parade that goes through Flörsheim on Carnival Sunday. It attracts many thousands of spectators. In 2007 it attracted over 80,000 people.

Economy
The Fraport subsidiary Fraport Immobilienservice und -entwicklungs GmbH & Co. KG has its head office in Flörsheim am Main.

Culture and sport clubs
 Ball-Sport-Club 1985 Flörsheim e.V.
 ESV Blaugold Flörsheim e.V.; seit 1953, Sportarten Kegeln und Darts
 FC Germania 1908 Weilbach e.V.
 Flörsheimer Carneval Verein 1928 e.V.
 Flörsheimer Narren Club 1962
 Flörsheimer Ruderverein 08 e.V.
 Flörsheimer Sammlerverein Untermain e.V.; Briefmarken, Briefe, Postkarten, Münzen, Euromünzen
 Kerbeborsch 6091 Weilbach e.V.
 Regionalpark Rhein-Main
 Reitsportverein Flörsheim 1927 e.V.
 Schützengesellschaft 1906 e.V. Flörsheim am Main
 SV 09 Flörsheim
 SV Edelweiß 1899 e.V. (Schützenverein)
 TV Wicker e.V.
 Ata Moschee, an Ahmadiyya mosque

References

External links 

  
 
 Cultural monuments in Flörsheim as a map or list denkxweb.denkmalpflege-hessen.de
 
 Flörsheimer Zeitung 1906–1932 digital

Towns in Hesse
Main-Taunus-Kreis
Historic Jewish communities
Populated places on the Main basin
Populated riverside places in Germany
Rheingau